Jerry Karl Sonzahi Lawrence is an English footballer who plays as a midfielder for EFL League One club Bristol Rovers.

Career
Lawrence joined Bristol Rovers at under-12s level, having initially been rejected for a trial for the under-8s. At the end of the 2021–22 season, Lawrence was awarded the U18 Player of the Year award.

Ahead of the 2022–23 season, Lawrence was promoted to training with the first-team over pre-season, impressing in the first friendly as he scored the second in a 6–1 friendly victory over Melksham Town. On 6 August 2022, Lawrence made his senior first-team debut when he came off the bench as a late substitute in a 4–0 away thrashing of Burton Albion. On 10 October 2022, Lawrence signed his first professional contract with the club, a two-year deal. On 4 November 2022, Lawrence joined Southern League Premier Division South club Salisbury on a one-month loan deal. In January 2023, the loan was extended for a further month. He returned to his parent club in February 2023.

Career statistics

References

Living people
English footballers
Association football midfielders
Bristol Rovers F.C. players
Salisbury F.C. players
English Football League players
Southern Football League players
Year of birth missing (living people)